The Free State Brewing Company is a microbrewery based in Lawrence, Kansas. It opened in 1989 as the first legal brewery in Kansas in over 100 years. In 2010, the brewery announced plans to expand to distribute to vendors in Kansas and Missouri, and as far east as St. Louis. On May 21, 2010 Free State Brewery began to distribute bottled beer to stores in Lawrence, Kansas.  Four bottled beers were released: Copperhead Pale Ale, Oatmeal Stout, Ad Astra Ale, and Wheat State Golden.

Beers

The first beer Free State Brewing Company made, Ad Astra Ale (which takes its name from part of Kansas's state motto), won a Bronze Medal at the 1991 Great American Beer Festival.

External links
Free State Brewing Company

References

Beer brewing companies based in Kansas
1989 establishments in Kansas
Lawrence, Kansas